General Bakht Khan is a 1979 Pakistani film about the Indian Rebellion of 1857,  directed by Sarshar Akhtar Malik and produced by Nosheen Malik. Film starring actor Mohammad Ali, Yousuf Khan, Sultan Rahi and Sudhir.

Cast
 Sultan Rahi – جنرل بخت خان
 Neelo – (Love interest of General Bakht Khan)
 Mohammad Ali – Haji Baba
 Badar Munir – Jamil Baig
 Sudhir – (Commander) Zubair
 Yousuf Khan – (Mujahid-e-Awwal) Farooq Khan
 Adeeb – (General) Sheel
 Badar Munir – (father of Bakht) Abdullah Khan
 Ilyas Kashmiri – Baba
 Changezi – (General) Mauoos
 Nasrullah Butt – (General) Ladkand
 Badal
 Abu Shah

Soundtrack
The music of the film is by musician Akhtar Hussain Akhian. The lyrics are penned by Khawaja Pervez and singer is Mehdi Hassan.
 Yaad Kar Karbala Ka Woh Zamana sung by Mehdi Hassan

References

External links
 

Films set in the British Raj
Films set in the Mughal Empire
1979 films
1970s historical films
1970s Urdu-language films
Pakistani historical films
Films about the Indian Rebellion of 1857
1979 directorial debut films
Urdu-language Pakistani films